West Brooklyn is a village in Lee County, Illinois, United States. The population was 142 at the 2010 census, down from 174 in 2000.

History
Henry F. Gehant (1863–1927), farmer, merchant, and banker, served in the Illinois General Assembly; he also served as president of the West Brooklyn Village Board.

Geography

West Brooklyn is located at  (41.693533, -89.147123).

Demographics

As of the census of 2000, there were 174 people, 60 households, and 43 families residing in the village. The racial makeup of the village was 91.95% White, 0.57% African American, 1.15% Native American, 0.57% Asian, 1.72% from other races, and 4.02% from two or more races. Hispanic or Latino of any race were 5.75% of the population.

There were 60 households, out of which 38.3% had children under the age of 18 living with them, 65.0% were married couples living together, and 28.3% were non-families. 26.7% of all households were made up of individuals, and 10.0% had someone living alone who was 65 years of age or older. The average household size was 2.90 and the average family size was 3.56.

In the village, the population was spread out, with 35.1% under the age of 18, 7.5% from 18 to 24, 32.8% from 25 to 44, 17.2% from 45 to 64, and 7.5% who were 65 years of age or older. The median age was 32 years. For every 100 females, there were 100.0 males. For every 100 females age 18 and over, there were 109.3 males.

The median income for a household in the village was $34,375, and the median income for a family was $44,750. Males had a median income of $26,786 versus $27,750 for females. The per capita income for the village was $16,102. About 2.4% of families and 1.7% of the population were below the poverty line, including none of those under the age of eighteen and 21.4% of those 65 or over.

References

Villages in Lee County, Illinois
Villages in Illinois